Angela Curran is an English actress, known for  Death at a Funeral (2007), Jane Eyre (2011) and The Danish Girl (2015).

In 2003, Curran had her own one woman show, Happy Talk, broadcast on Radio 3.

She appeared as security guard Janette in 18 episodes of the ITV sitcom The Job Lot which aired in 2013. Curran's television and film work includes Doc Martin as Caitlin Morgan, Nicholas Nickleby (2002), Calendar Girls (2003) as May, Emmerdale as  Babs Mowbray, The Iron Lady (2011) and Mike Leigh's Naked (1993), Secrets & Lies (1996), Vera Drake (2004) as a prisoner, (2011) and Mr. Turner (2014).

Curran worked on several occasions with Victoria Wood, including on an episode of Dinnerladies in 1999 and in the TV film Eric and Ernie in 2011.

In 2016, Curran appeared in The Restoration of Nell Gwyn at Park Theatre (London).

As of 2018, Curran has played  Mrs Hobbs in the CBeebies show Waffle the Wonder Dog. Curran appeared in an episode of Coronation Street in 2019, as well as an episode of Doctors as Hannah Homewood in May 2021.

Filmography

Television series

References

External links
 

20th-century English actresses
21st-century English actresses
English film actresses
English radio actresses
English stage actresses
English television actresses
Actors from Manchester
Living people
Year of birth missing (living people)